Gross pathology refers to macroscopic manifestations of disease in organs, tissues, and body cavities. The term is commonly used by anatomical pathologists to refer to diagnostically useful findings made during the gross examination portion of surgical specimen processing or an autopsy.

It is vital to systematically explain the gross appearance of a pathological state, for example, a malignant tumor, noting the site, size, shape, consistency, presence of a capsule and appearance on cut section whether well circumscribed or diffusely infiltrating, homogeneous or variegated, cystic, necrotic, hemorrhagic areas, as well as papillary projections.